Anderson School may refer to:

In the United States

 UCLA Anderson School of Management, Los Angeles, California
 Anderson School (Bozeman, Montana)
 Anderson School of Management (University of New Mexico), Albuquerque, New Mexico
 The Anderson School PS 334, a citywide public K-8 gifted school, New York City
 The Sarah Anderson School, PS 9, a public K-5 school, New York City
 Anderson Private School, White Settlement, Texas
 Anderson School (Bothell, Washington), a bar, restaurant and hotel in a former school building